Keith Warner (born 6 December 1956) is a British opera director, designer and translator. He is noted for his flamboyant stagings of Richard Wagner's operas.

Early years
Warner was born in London and went to Woodhouse School in Finchley, North London and then studied English and drama at the University of Bristol from 1975-78.  He subsequently worked as an actor, a teacher of drama therapy and a fringe theatre director.  He joined English National Opera in 1981, working as revival director, staff director and associate director until 1989.  In 1985, he also worked as associate director for Scottish Opera.

Career
In the late 1980s and early 1990s, Warner combined the roles of director of productions for New Sussex Opera, artistic director for Nexus Opera and associate artistic director of Opera Omaha.

In 2005, Warner staged Wagner's Tannhäuser at the Stadttheater Minden, with the Nordwestdeutsche Philharmonie conducted by Frank Beermann.

Warner was appointed artistic director of the Royal Danish Opera, taking up the post in July 2011, but resigned after six months, along with conductor and music director Jakub Hrůša, as a result of problems with funding.

In the 2014/15 Season he directed Welsh National Opera's production of Peter Pan at the Royal Opera House and on tour.

References

British opera directors
Living people
1956 births